Jeroen Aart Krabbé (born 5 December 1944) is a Dutch actor and film director with a successful career in both Dutch and English-language films. He is best known to international audiences for his leading roles in the Paul Verhoeven films Soldier of Orange (1977) and The Fourth Man (1983), for playing the villain General Georgi Koskov in the James Bond film The Living Daylights (1987) and his parts in The Prince of Tides (1991), The Fugitive (1993), and Immortal Beloved (1994). His 1998 directorial debut, Left Luggage, was nominated for the Golden Bear at the 49th Berlin International Film Festival.

Early life
Krabbé was born into an artistic family in Amsterdam. Both his father, Maarten Krabbé, and grandfather Hendrik Maarten Krabbé were well-known painters, and his mother Margreet (née Reiss; 1914–2002), was a film translator. His brother, Tim, is a writer and top-level chess player, and his half-brother, Mirko, is an artist. Only later in life did he learn that his mother was Jewish and that her family had been killed during the Holocaust.

Career

Internationally, he first came to prominence in fellow Dutchman Paul Verhoeven's films, Soldier of Orange opposite Rutger Hauer and The Fourth Man with Renée Soutendijk. His first big American film was the Whoopi Goldberg comedy, Jumpin' Jack Flash. However, it was his roles as villains in a string of international films from the late 1980s and early 1990s which brought him international stardom, with notable roles such as Losado in No Mercy (1986), General Georgi Koskov in the James Bond film The Living Daylights (1987), Gianni Franco in The Punisher (1989), Herbert Woodruff in The Prince of Tides (1991), and Dr. Charles Nichols in The Fugitive (1993). He appeared in numerous TV productions, and as Satan in the TV production Jesus.

He was both director and producer of a 1998 film about Orthodox Jews during the 1970s in Antwerp, Belgium, co-starring Isabella Rossellini and Maximilian Schell called Left Luggage, as well as the Harry Mulisch novel adapted into film The Discovery of Heaven. Left Luggage was entered into the 48th Berlin International Film Festival. The following year, he was a member of the jury at the 49th Berlin International Film Festival.

His television work included playing an uncanny psychic in the Midsomer Murders series 11 episode "Talking to the Dead". Krabbé had an exhibition of his paintings in Museum de Fundatie (Zwolle), in 2008. He began working on documentaries for Dutch television about his favorite painters. In 2015 the first series were about Van Gogh, followed in 2017 by a series about Picasso, in 2018 by Gauguin and in 2020, about Chagall and recently, in August 2022, about Frida Kahlo.

Personal life
Krabbé married Herma van Gemert in 1964. Together they have three sons – Martijn (who is a radio and television presenter), Jasper and Jacob.

Apart from acting and directing, he is an accomplished artist (his paintings have appeared on Dutch postage stamps), and has co-authored a Dutch cookbook. In November 2004, he released the book Schilder, which is an overview of his paintings.

Selected filmography

Actor

 Fietsen naar de Maan (1963) as decoration trainee
 Professor Columbus (1968) as Jan
 The Little Ark (1972) as first man
 Alicia (1974) as pilot
 Soldaat van Oranje (1977) as Guus LeJeune
 Martijn en de magiër (1979) as regisseur
 Een pak slaag (1979) as Dries Barns
 Spetters (1980) as Frans Henkhof
 Een Vlucht Regenwulpen (1981) as Maarten (alter ego)
 World War III (1982, TV Miniseries) as Colonel Alexander Vorashin
 Het verleden (1982) as Harry Heyblom
 The Fourth Man (1983) as Gerard Reve
 Het Dagboek van Anne Frank (1985, TV Movie) as Otto Frank
 Turtle Diary (1985) as Mr. Sandor (the slob)
 In de schaduw van de overwinning (1986) as Peter van Dijk
 Jumpin' Jack Flash (1986) as Mark Van Meter
 No Mercy (1986) as Losado
 Code Name Dancer (1987) as Malarin
 Miami Vice (1987, "Heroes of the Revolution") as Klaus Herzog
 The Living Daylights (1987) as General Georgi Koskov
 A World Apart (1988) as Gus Roth
 Crossing Delancey (1988) as Anton Maes
 Shadow Man (1988) as Theo
 Jan Cox A Painter's Odyssey (1988) as Narrator (voice)
 Scandal (1989) as Eugene Ivanov
  (1989) as David Keller
 The Punisher (1989) as Gianni Franco
 Till There Was You (1990) as Robert "Viv" Vivaldi
 Robin Hood (1991) as Baron Roger Daguerre
 Sahara Sandwich (1991)
 Kafka (1991) as Bizzlebek
 The Prince of Tides (1991) as Herbert Woodruff
 Dynasty: The Reunion (1991, TV Series) as Jeremy Van Dorn
 For a Lost Soldier (1992) as Jeroen Boman (old)
 Stalin (1992) as Nikolai Bukharin
 King of the Hill (1993) as Mr. Kurlander
 Oeroeg (1993) as Hendrik Ten Berghe
 The Fugitive (1993) as Dr. Charles Nichols
 Farinelli (1994) as George Frideric Handel
 Immortal Beloved (1994) as Anton Schindler
 The Disappearance of Garcia Lorca (1996) as Colonel Aguirre
 The Odyssey (1997) as King Alcinous of Phaeacia
 Left Luggage (1998) as Mr. Kalman
 Dangerous Beauty (1998) as Pietro Venier
 Ever After (1998) as Auguste
 An Ideal Husband (1999) as Baron Arnheim
 Jesus (1999) as Satan
 Il Cielo Cade (The Sky is Falling)  (2000) as Wilhelm
 The Discovery of Heaven (2001) as Gabriel
 Fogbound (2002) as Dr. Duff
 Ocean's Twelve (2004) as Van der Woude
 Off Screen (2005) as Gerard Wesselinck
 Deuce Bigalow: European Gigolo (2005) as Gaspar Voorsboch
 Snuff-Movie (2005) as Boris Arkadin (Mr. Maezel)
 Life! (2005) as Hugo
 Dalziel and Pascoe (2006,  "Wrong Time, Wrong Place") as Det Supt Wim de Kuiper
 Midsomer Murders (2008, "Talking to the Dead") as Cyrus LeVanu
 Transporter 3 (2008) as Leonid Vasilev
 Yankee Go Home (2009) as Minister
  (2009) as Albert Schweitzer
 Rico's Wings (2009)
 Alleen maar nette mensen (2011) as Bram Samuels
 Tula: The Revolt (2013) as Gouverneur De Veer
 Gangster Kittens (2016) as Pierre
 Amerikali Kiz (2018)
 De Liefhebbers (2019) as Jan
 The Host (2020) as Vera's father
 Bosrandgeluk (2020) (short)

Director
 Het Dagboek van Anne Frank (TV Movie 1985)
 Left Luggage (1998)
 The Discovery of Heaven (2001)

Bibliography
 Alles bleef zoals het niet was / J. H. van Geemert gedichten ; Jeroen Krabbé tekeningen – Amsterdam : De Beuk, 1992. 29 p. . Opl. van 60 genummerde en gesigneerde ex. losbl. in cassette, 
 Bezuinigingskookboek : kookboek voor de jaren 80 / Marjan Berk and Jeroen Krabbé – Amsterdam : Tiebosch, 1980. 189 p. . 2e dr. (1985) zonder ondertitel: [illustration Jan van Wessum] – Haarlem : Gottmer, 1985. 183 p. 
 Het eenvoudige kookboek / Marian "Marjan" Berk, Jeroen Krabbé ; [illustration Pam Pollack et al.] – Amsterdam: Atlas, 1993. 207 p. . Herz. versie van: Bezuinigingskookboek.

References

External links

 
 Jeroen Krabbe profile, virtual-history.com; accessed 25 July 2020.

1944 births
Commanders of the Order of the Netherlands Lion
Dutch film directors
Dutch male film actors
Dutch male painters
Dutch male television actors
Dutch Jews
Golden Calf winners
Living people
Male actors from Amsterdam